= 2022 Birmingham Games =

2022 Birmingham Games may refer to:

- 2022 Commonwealth Games, held in Birmingham, England
- 2022 World Games, held in Birmingham, Alabama
